Located Highland, Maryland in Howard County, Maryland, United States, St. Mark's Episcopal Church.
The church is a wood-framed building three bays wide by four bays deep built in 1874. A L shaped parish house was built on the property next to the church in 1955. The pews were capable of holding 120 persons. An adjoining rectory was added in 1964.

See also
List of Howard County properties in the Maryland Historical Trust

References

Highland, Maryland
History of Maryland